Nagongera is a town in Tororo District, in the Eastern Region of Uganda.

Location
The coordinates of the town are 00°46'12.0"N, 34°01'34.0"E (Latitude:0.7700; Longitude:34.0261).

Population
In 2014, the national census and household survey enumerated the population of Nagongera at 12,341.

In 2015, the Uganda Bureau of Statistics (UBOS), estimated the population of Nagongera Municipal Council at 12,600. In 2020, the population agency estimated the mid-year population of the municipality at 14,300 people. Of these, 7,300 (51 percent) were females and 7,000 (49 percent) were males. UBOS calculated the population growth rate of Nagongera Town to average 2.56 percent annually, between 2015 and 2020.

Overview
Nagongera attained municipality status in 2006. Up until that time, the town had no piped running water. That year, the Directorate of Water Development of the  Uganda Ministry of Water and Environment, started the piped water project for Nagongera, using capital of USh700 million (about US$200,000 at that time).

Points of interest
The following points of interest lie in or near Nagongera:

1. The offices of Nagongera Town Council

2. Nagongera Central Market

3. Nagongera Train Station

4. The town of Nagongera is the location of one of the campuses of Busitema University, a public university in Uganda.

5. Nagongera Health Centre IV

Notable residents
Paskar Owor, middle-distance runner

See also
List of cities and towns in Uganda

References

External links
 Road Trip to Nagongera

Populated places in Eastern Region, Uganda
Tororo District